Temir-Kanat is a village in the Issyk-Kul Region of Kyrgyzstan, established in 1936. The name means 'metal wing' in Kyrgyz. The village is in the Tong District. Its population was 1,361 in 2021.

References

Populated places in Issyk-Kul Region